The Andhra Pradesh Decentralisation and Inclusive Development of All Regions Act, 2020 is an act of Andhra Pradesh Legislature aimed at the decentralisation of  governance in the Indian state of Andhra Pradesh. The bill was proposed by the Government of Andhra Pradesh to establish three capitals at different places in the state namely Visakhapatnam, Amaravati, and Kurnool, which will serve as executive, legislative and judicial capitals respectively.

The Act was mainly proposed to balance the Governance in all the parts of the state taking into consideration the aspirations of the people of all the regions of the state. The act was mostly derived from the principles of Siva Rama Krishnan Committee appointed by the Indian Government; G.N. Rao committee and Boston Consulting Group (BCG) committee appointed by the Andhra Pradesh Government.

The bill received the Governor's assent on 31 July 2020. Government of Andhra Pradesh issued gazette notification on the same day, thus becoming an Act.

Background

Andhra State 

On August 15, 1947, India became independent country from British rule. Ramaswamy Reddiyar was the first Chief Minister of Madras state consisting Tamil Nadu and Rayalaseema, Coastal Andhra regions. Madras State was succeeded from Madras Presidency on January 26, 1950. However, the Telugu-speaking people were unhappy with the decision, as Tamil-speaking people dominated the entire statehood. Thus they called for Andhra movement and demanded for new state. Potti Sri Ramulu one of the strong activists, took indefinite hunger strike from October 19, 1952 and demanded for a separate Andhra state from the Madras state for the Telugu speaking people. On 15 December 1952, Sri ramulu died in the fasting camp after commencing his fasting about 58 days. As the news of his death broke, massive violence and protests spread all over the southern states of India. As a result of his sacrifice, the Prime Minister Jawaharlal Nehru bifurcated Madras state to the new Andhra state consisting eleven districts of Coastal Andhra and Rayalaseema on October 1, 1953 with Kurnool as its temporary capital of Andhra state and the Madras city as permanent capital of Madras state. The High court of the Andhra state was established in Guntur on basis of Sribagh Pact.

Sri Bagh Pact of 1937 

The Rayalaseema people raised concerns about several issues based on education, development and discrimination. Several controversies had made inequality difficulties and regional imbalance fears among people of rayalaseema. In November 1937, several leaders of Rayalaseema and Coastal Andhra had discussed on several issues and made an agreement pact.

On discussing issues regarding to capital, and legislature the following terms was agreed:

States Reorganisation Act, 1956 

On 1956, the Parliament of India introduced an act which was a major reform of the boundaries of Indian states and territories, organising them along linguistic lines. Following the effects of changes made to Constitution of India, the newly Combined Andhra Pradesh was formed by the merger of Hyderabad state along with Andhra state for Telugu speaking people's demand.

United Andhra Pradesh State 

However, Telugu-speaking people demanded for their long-cherished Visalandhra statehood formation. The States Reorganisation Commission headed by Syed Fazal Ali heard the views of different people and organizations of both states. Based on the commission's conclusions, the Government of India preferred Visalandhra and enlarged the state by including nine Telugu speaking districts of Hyderabad state to eleven districts of Andhra state to form Andhra Pradesh with 20 districts. The Andhra Pradesh state was formed by the merger of Hyderabad state and Andhra state with its new capital Hyderabad on basis of Gentlemen's Agreement of 1956. The Telangana leaders proposed that the High court of the Andhra Pradesh state should be located in Hyderabad and a bench should be constituted in Guntur. But the Andhra leaders rejected it by stating that high court can be established in hyderabad and there was no need for a bench in Guntur district.

New Andhra Pradesh State 
During 1969 to 1973, several movements like Telangana movement and 1972 Jai Andhra movement took place for bifurcation of the state. Protests started with the hunger strike of a student from Khammam district for the implementation of safe-guards promised during the creation of Andhra Pradesh. The movement slowly manifested into a demand for a separate statehood. Amid, the people of Telangana had alleged violations of Gentlemen's Agreement of 1956 led to the 1969 Telangana movement and cited as one of the main reasons for the demands of separate statehood for Telangana region. On June 2, 2014 United Andhra Pradesh has bifurcated into
Telangana consisting of 10 districts, and residuary Andhra Pradesh consisting 13 districts with Hyderabad as permanent capital for Telangana state.

AP Reorganisation Act, 2014 
The Parliament of India implemented an act that defined the boundaries of the two states, and laid out the status of Hyderabad as the permanent capital of Telangana state and temporary capital of the Andhra Pradesh state for 10 years. It had also mentioned that a new capital for the state of Andhra Pradesh will be chosen by the committee it appointed known as "Siva Rama Krishnan Committee" headed by a renowned retired IAS Officer, K.C. Siva Rama Krishnan.

Capital and Criticism 
Siva Rama Krishnan Committee

The committee headed by K. C. Siva Rama Krishnan and its experts members toured all of the state and had submitted their report. The report suggested to go for a decentralised development i.e., by transferring the powers of the Government to several parts of the state, using the resources of the state to the fullest and heavily warned not to go for a "honeypot" model of establishing each and every resource in and around a single town or a city. It had even objected the model of Hyderabad which the state had earlier implemented by establishing every government power in and around Hyderabad. The committee strongly objected choosing any capital between Vijayawada and Guntur (as the members of Telugu Desam Party started to say they might establish a capital around Vijayawada and Guntur even prior to the committee report was submitted) feeling that might disturb the agricultural delta lands of Krishna River. The committee instead suggested for going on an all-round based development without disturbing the environmental concerns. It had also mentioned to use less land area for the capital usage and clearly mentioned the area needed for the capital functions in its report. The committee submitted the report on August 27, 2014.

Amaravati chosen as the capital

However the then Government of Andhra Pradesh led by Chandrababu Naidu as the Chief Minister was not satisfied with the report of Siva Rama Krishnan Committee. Instead a new committee was appointed under the then Municipal Minister of the Government, P. Narayana and eventually chose Amaravati of Guntur district as the capital against to the suggestions made by the Indian government appointed Siva Rama Krishnan Committee. The then government led by Chandrababu Naidu as the Chief Minister had gone ahead for constructing a Mega Greenfield city without even considering the suggestions made by the Siva Rama Krishnan committee to divide the governance powers. An area of around 33000 acres was brought under Land pooling scheme for the capital just what the Siva Rama Krishnan committee warned not to do.

Criticism in choosing Amaravati as a "Honey-pot" capital

Heavy criticism was met for not considering the suggestions made by the Indian government appointed Siva Rama Krishnan Committee to transfer the powers of the government to various parts of the state. Replicating the model of Hyderabad again was also heavily criticized. The amount of the area chosen for the capital of about 33000 acres also raised controversy in the public while the rest of the mega cities of the whole country itself were very small when compared to the proposed size of the capital. There was also heavy criticism for not including Rayalaseema region in any capital function which has been a demand from that region. People and experts of that region staged many protests to include them in any capital function as a part of the Sribagh Pact. But they were not considered by the then Government which was also largely criticized by the public. There was also criticism for choosing Amaravati as the capital which falls under fertile agricultural lands. However the then government led by Chief Minister Chandrababu Naidu had gone ahead with capital being proposed at Amaravati for which the foundation stone was laid by Prime Minister Narendra Modi on 1 April 2015.

Criticism for the cost proposed for Amaravati as a Mega Capital City 
The large cost proposed to construct the buildings in the capital was also heavily criticized when the state itself was suffering economically. The then government made plans of constructing the capital with more than 100,000 crores was hugely criticized from all the sections of the media and public. The government had even made plans of constructing Nine cities inside the proposed capital which required large financial support in the form of loans. This was also heavily criticized by all the sections of media and people when the state itself was struggling economically. This whole concept of constructing a mega greenfield capital city was not supported by the media and people as they felt that was not needed at a time like that. Ironically, the Telugu Desam Party lost in all the assembly segments of the capital in 2019 Andhra Pradesh elections. The son of the then Chief Minister Chandrababu Naidu, Nara Lokesh who had contested in Mangalagiri Constituency which falls under the capital region too lost.

Criticism for not choosing Visakhapatnam as the capital 
The government was deeply criticized for not choosing the already established and largest city of Andhra Pradesh, Visakhapatnam which had all the infrastructure and the government lands needed to house the capital. Instead the government opted for land pooling 33000 acres of agricultural land. The then government had not given its opinion for choosing a new greenfield mega city which needed huge financial backing continuously which was also heavily criticized. The then Opposition Leader Y. S. Jaganmohan Reddy had continuously accused Chandrababu Naidu and the members of Telugu Desam Party for allegedly involving in a land grabbing scam in the capital region and felt that it might be their reason to choose Amaravati as the capital region.

Change of Power in the government in 2019 

YSR Congress Party

For various reasons, Telugu Desam Party headed by Chandrababu Naidu lost in the 2019 Andhra Pradesh Legislative Assembly elections. The YSR Congress Party won the elections and Y. S. Jaganmohan Reddy became the Chief Minister of Andhra Pradesh in 2019. The Telugu Desam Party lost in all the assembly constituencies of the capital region in 2019 Andhra Pradesh legislative Assembly Elections to much surprise.

Committees for the new capital(s) 
The Government headed by the Chief Minister Y. S. Jaganmohan Reddy felt that the previous state government led by Chandrababu Naidu didn't take Siva Rama Krishnan committee into consideration about choosing the capital and also came to an opinion that constructing a mega greenfield city would eventually increase the burden on the government and also wouldn't cater to the rest of the state's aspirations which might take years of time to get a shape with huge financial backing from the government continuously. This would also interfere with the government's other financial schemes and development related works. So the government led by the Chief Minister Y. S. Jaganmohan Reddy appointed two new experts committees; G. N. Rao Committee, headed by a renowned retired IAS Officer G.N.Rao and Boston Consulting Group Committee to give a report on a new capital location and development of the state on September 19, 2019.

G. N. Rao Committee and Boston Consulting Group (BCG) Committee 
Both the experts committees unanimously suggested for a decentralised development by transferring the powers of governance to the various parts of the state by choosing Visakhapatnam as executive, Amaravati as Legislative and Kurnool as Judicial Capitals and to fully use the resources and include the regions with faster pace development by establishing regional development boards. G. N. Rao committee submitted its report on December 20, 2019. Boston Consulting Group submitted its report on January 3, 2020.

High Power Committee 
A high power committee was appointed by the government which included the ministers of the government to study the two committees; B.N. Rao committee and Boston Consulting Group Committee and to submit a final report discussing both committees. The same was submitted on January 17, 2020.

Bill prepared 
After following through the report of the high power committee and two appointed committees; BN Rao Committee and Boston Consulting Group Committee, the cabinet of the Government of Andhra Pradesh had gone ahead with the reports of the committees and prepared a bill to make Visakhapatnam as the executive capital, Amaravati as the legislative capital and Kurnool as the Judicial Capital for the state of Andhra Pradesh which was approved by the cabinet on January 20, 2020. The bill was then introduced and passed on the same day in the Andhra Pradesh Legislative Assembly.

The Bill 
The Bill is envisaged to make Visakhapatnam the executive capital, Amaravati as the legislative capital, and Kurnool as the judicial Capital of Andhra Pradesh.

 Raj Bhawan, Secretariat, Chief Minister's camp office and offices of all the Heads of the Departments of Andhra Pradesh will be located at Visakhapatnam
 Seat of Legislature will be located at Amaravati
 Principal Seat of High court of Andhra Pradesh, Chief Justice and Judges' residences and all other state level Judicial institutions will be located at Kurnool.
 An additional Bench of High Court will also be located at Visakhapatnam to cater to the needs of the regions around the city.

Legislative timeline of the Bill 
The Yuvajana Sramika Rythu Congress Party government introduced the bill on cabinet to decentralise the governance in the state of 13 districts. Later, the bill was introduced in the Andhra Pradesh Legislative Assembly. The bill was passed on the Andhra Pradesh Legislative Assembly by having majority of the seats after 17 MLA's of the Telugu Desam Party were suspended due to the continuous obstruction. Although the bill was passed by the Andhra Pradesh Legislative Assembly, the lower house of Andhra Pradesh Legislature, it was stalled in the Andhra Pradesh Legislative Council by the Telugu Desam Party which had majority in the legislative council. No voting was called for by the Speaker or by the majority Telugu Desam Party members of the legislative Council when the bill was introduced. Without any prior information given to the legislature, the Majority membered Telugu Desam Party of the legislative council sent a notice to the speaker urging to send the bills for Select committee. This sparked a widespread criticism from the Ruling YSRCP government members claiming it as against to the laws of the legislature. Any notice that to be put before the chairman must be submitted to the legislature a day before. The chairman without calling for any voting for the bill, unwillingly agreed terming it as "something he wouldn't want to do" and had sent the bills to the select committee using his discretionary powers unwillingly. This caused a widespread criticism and uproar from the experts and the people of the state criticising the speaker that he acted biased to favour the Telugu Desam Party without following the procedure of law. This behavior from the speaker and Telugu Desam Party deeply saddened the Chief Minister, Jagan Mohan Reddy for why he wished to abolish the legislative council. He opined that the Legislative council must respect the legislative assembly's decisions which was not happening then. He passed a resolution in the legislative assembly to abolish the legislative council and had sent the same to the central government. As no Select committee was formed or convened, as per the law, if no select committee was formed or convened within 3 months on the submission of the bill then the bill is treated as deemed to have been passed. The bill was again tabled in the legislative assembly after 3 months and it was passed in the assembly amid walkout from the side of Telugu Desam Party. But the very Telugu Desam Party had not boycotted the legislative council which caused criticism from the experts in their party's stand in each house. The Speaker or the majority membered Telugu Desam Party of the legislative council again had not called for any voting and simply stalled the passage of the bill and adjourned the house sine die without the passage or rejection of the bill. As the bill was tabled twice, and no select committee being formed, the bill got passed and became an act as a bill doesn't need legislative council's consent when brought for the second time. This whole episode of the behaviour of majority membered Telugu Desam Party members and the speaker of Legislative Council caused huge criticism from all sections of media, people, experts for acting against the rules and law. The speaker of the legislative council was heavily criticized for having been acted biased during the passage of the bills. The party chief, Chandrababu Naidu was also criticised for being present in the legislative council's gallery which experts opine of influencing the speaker. However after careful and proper verification, the Governor of Andhra Pradesh gave his assent to the bill on July 31, 2020 and the bill became an act.

Concerns

Reactions 
After the bill got passed on January 20, 2020, in the state legislative assembly, there was a celebration in the ruling party camp, while the decision caused consternation among others including the farmers of Amaravati who had given about 34,000 acres of their land for the capital. The ruling YSR Congress Party claimed that the move was aimed at decentralisation, but critics pointed out that the Jagan Mohan Reddy government made no difference between the distribution of capital functions and the decentralisation of development initiatives. The decision was also widely seen as essentially 'making capital out of political rivalry'.

Protests 

The idea of three capitals by the Chief minister Y. S. Jaganmohan Reddy caused widespread demonstrations by the farmers of Krishna and Guntur districts. The passage of the bill triggered different types of protests and criticisms against the government. In the capital region of the state, farmers are against the theory of three capitals They stated that, the bill is against agreements to the farmers who gave 33,000 acres of agricultural lands to the government. After the bill was passed on 21 January 2020 by the Andhra Pradesh Legislative Assembly, violent protests erupted in Amaravati.

References 

Proposed laws
2020 in Indian politics
2020 in Indian law
History of Andhra Pradesh (2014–present)
2020s in Andhra Pradesh